Hawks is a surname. Notable people with the surname include:

Annie Hawks (1836–1918), American poet, gospel hymnist
Bill Hawks (born 1944), American politician, former civil servant, and an agricultural businessman
Charles Hawks, Jr. (1899–1960), Wisconsin politician
Francis L. Hawks (1798–1866), American priest of the Episcopal Church, and a politician in North Carolina.
Frank Hawks (1897–1938), American aviator, served in the U.S. Army in World War I, and record breaking aviator in 1920s and 1930s
Eli Hawks (1829-1900), American politician
Howard Hawks (1896–1977), American film director, producer and screenwriter
John D. Hawks, anthropologist
John Twelve Hawks, author of the 2005 dystopian novel The Traveler and its sequels
Nelson Hawks (1840–1929), American typographer, notable for creating the 12-points-per-inch pica typographical standard
Tony Hawks (born 1960), British comedian and author

English-language surnames